Red bananas are a group of varieties of banana with reddish-purple skin. Some are smaller and plumper than the common Cavendish banana, others much larger. When ripe, raw red bananas have a flesh that is cream to light pink in color. They are also softer and sweeter than the yellow Cavendish varieties, some with a slight raspberry flavor and others with an earthy one. Many red bananas are exported by producers in East Africa, Asia, South America and the United Arab Emirates. They are a favorite in Central America as a form of aphrodisiac juice, along with being a favourite in India in order to promote fertility but are sold throughout the world.

Taxonomy and nomenclature 

The red banana is a triploid cultivar of the wild banana Musa acuminata, belonging to the AAA group.

Its official designation is Musa acuminata (AAA Group) 'Red Dacca'.

Synonyms include:
 Musa acuminata Colla (AAA Group) cv. 'Red'
 Musa sapientum L. f. rubra Bail.
 Musa sapientum L. var. rubra (Firm.) Baker 
 Musa rubra Wall. ex Kurz.
Musa × paradisiaca L. ssp. sapientum (L.) Kuntze var. rubra
 Musa acuminata Colla (AAA Group) cv. 'Cuban Red'
 Musa acuminata Colla (Cavendish Group) cv. 'Cuban Red'
 Musa acuminata Colla (AAA Group) cv. 'Red Jamaican'
 Musa acuminata Colla (AAA Group) cv. 'Jamaican Red'
 Musa acuminata Colla (AAA Group) cv. 'Spanish Red'.

It is known in English as Red dacca (Australia), Red banana, 'Red' banana (USA), Claret banana, Cavendish banana "Cuban Red", Jamaican red banana, and Red Cavendish banana.

Description 

Red bananas should have a deep red or maroon rind when ripe, and are best eaten when unbruised and slightly soft. This variety contains more beta carotene and vitamin C than yellow bananas. It also contains potassium and iron. The redder the fruit, the more carotene and the higher the vitamin C level. As with yellow bananas, red bananas will ripen in a few days at room temperature and are best stored outside from refrigeration.

Compared with the most common banana, the Cavendish banana, they tend to be smaller, have a slightly thicker skin with a sweeter taste, but do have a longer shelf life than yellow bananas. 
They tend to cost about 50% more per pound than yellow bananas, just because there is a much smaller supply of them.

Uses 
Red bananas are eaten in the same way as yellow bananas, by peeling the fruit before eating. They are frequently eaten raw, whole or chopped, and added to desserts and fruit salads, but can also be baked, fried, and toasted. Red bananas are also commonly sold dried in stores.

The red banana has more beta carotene and vitamin C than yellow banana varieties. All bananas contain natural sources of three sugars: sucrose, fructose, and glucose.

The first bananas to appear on the market in Toronto (in the 1870s and 1880s) were red bananas. Red bananas are available year round at specialty markets and larger supermarkets in the United States.

Diseases
 Panama disease

See also 
 Banana
 Banana cultivar groups
 Musa acuminata

References

External links

Banana cultivars